Missouri Route 110 may refer to:
Chicago–Kansas City Expressway
Missouri Route 110 (Jefferson County)